Pablo Gaglianone  (born 25 April 1976) is a Uruguayan footballer who plays as a midfielder.

Club career
Gaglianone began his professional career with Defensor Sporting and has played for several clubs in Uruguay and South America. He also had brief spells abroad: with Torino F.C. in Serie B and Kavala F.C. in the Greek Super League along with compatriot Hernán Rodrigo López.

He helped Defensor Sporting win the 2007–08 Uruguayan Primera División, defeating C.A. Peñarol in the finals.

References

External links

Profile at Lega Serie B

1976 births
Living people
Uruguayan footballers
Uruguayan expatriate footballers
Uruguayan Primera División players
Serie B players
Super League Greece players
Chilean Primera División players
Categoría Primera A players
Paraguayan Primera División players
Defensor Sporting players
Danubio F.C. players
Peñarol players
Liverpool F.C. (Montevideo) players
Club Atlético River Plate (Montevideo) players
Rampla Juniors players
Torino F.C. players
Kavala F.C. players
Colo-Colo footballers
Once Caldas footballers
Club Olimpia footballers
Expatriate footballers in Italy
Expatriate footballers in Greece
Expatriate footballers in Chile
Expatriate footballers in Colombia
Expatriate footballers in Paraguay
Footballers from Montevideo
Association football midfielders
Argentine football managers
Danubio F.C. managers